The 1995 Arab Super Cup was an international club competition played by the winners and runners up of the Arab Club Champions Cup and Arab Cup Winners' Cup. It was the second edition of the tournament to be played, but was the official first edition. Al-Shabab of Riyadh were crowned champions, with Saudi Professional League rivals Al-Hilal once again coming runners up. Also represented were Al-Ittihad, also of Saudi Arabia and the city of Jeddah and Egyptian giants Al-Ahly of Cairo.

Teams

Results and standings

Results in no particular order, dates of matches not known

References

External links
Arab Super Cup 1995 - rsssf.com

1995
1995
1995–96 in Saudi Arabian football
1995–96 in Egyptian football